Elma Halilcevic (born 18 June 2000) is a Danish handball player for Nykøbing Falster Håndboldklub and the Danish national junior team.

She also represented Denmark in the 2018 Women's Youth World Handball Championship and in the 2019 Women's Junior European Handball Championship, placing 6th both times.

Achievements 
Danish Championship:
Winner: 2019, 2020

References

2000 births
Living people
People from Esbjerg
Danish female handball players
Danish people of Bosnia and Herzegovina descent
Sportspeople from the Region of Southern Denmark